Cyperus praemorsus is a species of sedge that is endemic to Jamaica.

The species was first formally described by the botanist Johann Otto Boeckeler in 1859.

See also 
 List of Cyperus species

References 

praemorsus
Taxa named by Johann Otto Boeckeler
Plants described in 1859
Flora of Jamaica
Flora without expected TNC conservation status